Roger Verdi (born Rajinder Singh Virdee on 4 February 1953) is an English retired professional footballer who spent his entire career in North America, making over 100 league appearances in the North American Soccer League.

Early life
Verdi was born on 4 February 1953, as Rajinder Singh Virdee in Nairobi, Kenya, to Indian Sikh parents. He was the youngest of their two sons. The family moved to England when Verdi was aged seven, settling in Smethwick. He attended Sandwell Boys school.

Verdi changed his name due to racism. He went by 'Roger Jones' and 'Roger Jones Verdi' before settling on 'Roger Verdi'.

Career

England
Verdi played with the youth teams of both Wolverhampton Wanderers and Ipswich Town, but failing to get a professional contract with either team, moved to North America.

North America
Verdi began his career in Canada with the Vancouver Spartans.

Verdi played in the NASL between 1972 and 1978 for the Montreal Olympique, Miami Toros, St. Louis Stars and San Jose Earthquakes, making a total of 103 league appearances. He later played in the ASL for the Cleveland Cobras, Columbus Magic, and the Phoenix Fire, and in the MISL for Phoenix Inferno.

Coaching career
After his playing career ended he moved into coaching, holding assistant coaching positions with Athlone Town FC, Stockport County, Phoenix Inferno and Cleveland Cobras. Other coaching positions include Co-director for Hubert Vogelsinger Soccer Academy in Texas, Connecticut and California and has been the Technical Director for youth clubs in Washington, New Mexico. He joined DFW Tornados as a coach in 2010.

He is also the owner of the Roger Verdi International Soccer Academy.

Later life
Verdi retired to Dallas, Texas, working in construction.

References

1953 births
Living people
Footballers from Nairobi
English people of Punjabi descent
British sportspeople of Indian descent
British Asian footballers
English footballers
English expatriate footballers
Kenyan people of Indian descent
Kenyan emigrants to the United Kingdom
North American Soccer League (1968–1984) players
Montreal Olympique players
Miami Toros players
St. Louis Stars (soccer) players
San Jose Earthquakes (1974–1988) players
Wolverhampton Wanderers F.C. players
Ipswich Town F.C. players
Expatriate soccer players in Canada
Expatriate soccer players in the United States
Association football defenders
English expatriate sportspeople in the United States
English expatriate sportspeople in Canada
Cleveland Cobras players
Columbus Magic players
Phoenix Inferno players
American Soccer League (1933–1983) players
Major Indoor Soccer League (1978–1992) players
Phoenix Fire (soccer) players